Sanyuan is a county in the central part of Shaanxi province, China. It is the easternmost county-level division of Xianyang City.

Administrative divisions
As 2016, this County is divided to 11 towns.
Towns

Climate

Transportation
China National Highway 210
China National Highway 211

References

County-level divisions of Shaanxi
Xianyang